Bogaard is a surname. Notable people with the surname include:

 Amy Bogaard (born 1972), Canadian archaeologist and professor
 Bill Bogaard (born 1938), American politician

See also
 Boogaard